Joseph Vernon Holland (September 7, 1916 – January 23, 1992) was an American football, basketball, and baseball coach. He was the first head football coach for the Vanport Vikings (now the Portland State Vikings) located in Portland, Oregon.  He held that position for eight seasons, from 1947 until 1954.  His coaching record at Vanport was 20–42–3. Holland also served as Vanport's men's basketball during the 1947–48 season and as head baseball coach from 1946 to 1948. Holland also served as athletic director for Vanport and subsequently Portland State College from 1946 to 1964.

Head coaching record

Football

Basketball

References

External links
 

1916 births
1992 deaths
Basketball coaches from North Dakota
Portland State Vikings athletic directors
Portland State Vikings baseball coaches
Portland State Vikings football coaches
Portland State Vikings men's basketball coaches
People from Grand Forks County, North Dakota